Jessica Steck (born 6 August 1978) is a South African former tennis player. During her career on the professional tennis circuit from 1996 to 2003, she won the 1996 US Open Junior Girls' Doubles title and won several singles and doubles titles on the ITF Women's Circuit. Steck also won first-round doubles matches in all four Grand Slam events.

Career
She reached the singles world ranking of 140th in the world on 16 March 1998, and the 56th in doubles on 3 March 2003.

During her career, she won a WTA tournament in doubles.

WTA career finals

Doubles: 2 (1 title, 1 runner-up)

ITF finals

Singles: 9 (5–4)

Doubles: 15 (4–11)

Performance timelines

Doubles

Mixed doubles

WTA year-end rankings

Singles

Doubles

References

External links
 
 
 

South African female tennis players
1978 births
Sportspeople from Bloemfontein
Living people
White South African people
Grand Slam (tennis) champions in girls' doubles
US Open (tennis) junior champions